Baghak (also Romanized as Bāghak; also known as Bāgak and Bāghūk) is a village in Kahnuk Rural District, Irandegan District, Khash County, Sistan and Baluchestan Province, Iran. At the 2006 census, its population was 219, in 54 families.

References 

Populated places in Khash County